Ben Joshua Carter (בן קרטר; born August 22, 1994) is an American-Israeli basketball player for Hapoel Eilat of the Israel Basketball Premier League. He plays the power forward position.

Early and personal life
Carter was born in Tel Aviv, Israel, and is Jewish. He said that the fact that he is Israeli "means a lot. I take pride in my Israeli citizenship, my Israeli heritage, even though I haven’t lived there my whole life. I was born there. I still have roots there. I still take pride in my culture. Just to be able to represent my country whenever I can, every time I step out on the court, it’s really an honor."

Carter's parents are Mike and Israeli-born Hadar, a former lieutenant in the Israeli Army.  His father, Mike Carter, played one of his 17 professional seasons for Hapoel Jerusalem (1988–89), and played 13 seasons in Israel in total.  Carter also played 13 seasons in Tel Aviv, before the family relocated to Las Vegas, Nevada.  His father coached him growing up and playing for the Las Vegas Lakers on the AAU circuit.

Carter is 6' 9" (2.03 metres) tall. He weighs 224 pounds (102 kg). He attended Bishop Gorman High School ('12) in Las Vegas. Carter averaged 12.5 points and 8.5 rebounds per game as a junior, and was all-state and all-conference. He averaged 10.1 points and 7.4 rebounds per game as a senior, and was third-team all-state and all-conference.

Maccabiah Games
In 2013 Carter and his brother Tim played basketball for Team USA at the 2013 Maccabiah Games, winning a gold medal. He was the youngest member on the team, and his father was assistant coach to head coach Brad Greenberg.

College basketball
Carter played his first two seasons of college basketball for the University of Oregon. In his sophomore season in 2013–14 he was an honorable mention Academic All-Pac-12 selection.

Carter then transferred to and played for UNLV, where  earned his bachelor's degree. He sat out the 2014–15 season at UNLV as a redshirt. Carter averaged 8.6 points and six rebounds in his first and only year at UNLV.

Carter transferred to Michigan State University in the summer of 2016. He was granted a sixth year of eligibility the summer of 2017. Carter spent two years at Michigan State University as a graduate transfer. He sat out the 2016–17 season after suffering his second left knee injury in nine months, and averaged 0.7 points and 1.2 rebounds in 7.7 minutes over 23 games in 2017–18, while struggling with an ankle injury.

Professional basketball
In March 2018 Carter signed with the Hapoel Jerusalem basketball club.

As of 2020, he plays for Hapoel Eilat of the Israel Basketball Premier League.

References

External links
Michigan State Spartans bio
Twitter page

1994 births
Living people
American men's basketball players
American expatriate basketball people in Israel
Basketball players from Nevada
Bishop Gorman High School alumni
Competitors at the 2013 Maccabiah Games
Hapoel Eilat basketball players
Israeli men's basketball players
Maccabiah Games gold medalists for the United States
Maccabiah Games medalists in basketball
Michigan State Spartans men's basketball players
Oregon State Beavers men's basketball players
Power forwards (basketball)
Sportspeople from Las Vegas
Sportspeople from Tel Aviv
UNLV Runnin' Rebels basketball players
Israeli Jews
Jewish men's basketball players
Jewish American sportspeople
Jewish Israeli sportspeople
Israeli people of American-Jewish descent
21st-century American Jews